The  is Japanese aerial lift line in Kōbe, Hyōgo, operated by the Sanyō Electric Railway. Opened in 1957, the line climbs Mount Hachibuse (246m) of the Suma coast. Carlator is a portmanteau of "Car" and "escalator".

Basic data
System: Aerial tramway, 1 track cable and 2 haulage ropes
Distance: 
Vertical interval: 
Passenger capacity per a cabin: 30
Cabins: 2
Stations: 2

See also
List of aerial lifts in Japan

References

External links

 Sumaura Sanjō Amusement Park, from Sanyō Electric Railway official website.
 Carlator from Kansai City Guide website.
 

Aerial tramways in Japan
1957 establishments in Japan